Dox Castle is a  summit located in the Grand Canyon, in Coconino County of northern Arizona, US.

Dox Castle was named by William Wallace Bass and George Wharton James for Virginia Dox (1851–1941), who was the first white woman to visit this part of the Grand Canyon in 1891. Holy Grail Temple was originally named Bass Tomb by Virginia Dox, for William Bass, Dox's guide into the canyon. Impressed by her, Bass named Dox Castle shortly after she left. This butte's name was officially adopted in 1908 by the U.S. Board on Geographic Names. According to the Köppen climate classification system, Dox Castle is located in a cold semi-arid climate zone, with precipitation runoff draining west to the Colorado River via Shinumo Creek.

Dox Castle is composed of Cambrian rock from the Tonto Group, overlaying the Proterozoic Unkar Group at river level. Levi F. Noble named the Dox Formation because of exposures in a tributary to Shinumo Creek below Dox Castle.

Gallery

See also
 Geology of the Grand Canyon area

References

External links 

 Weather forecast: National Weather Service
 William Wallace Bass: Allhikers.com

Grand Canyon
Landforms of Coconino County, Arizona
Colorado Plateau
Grand Canyon National Park
North American 1000 m summits
Sandstone formations of the United States
Grand Canyon, North Rim
Grand Canyon, North Rim (west)